Okowvinjha is a former Tongva (Fernandeño) Native American settlement in Los Angeles County, California. It was located near the Mission San Fernando Rey de España in the San Fernando Valley. 

One source by Frederick Webb Hodge suggested that it may have been "identical" with Cahuenga. However, Hubert Howe Bancroft identified Okowvinjha, Kowanga (Cahuenga), and Saway-yanga each as different clans in the San Fernando area. He further identified the mission itself as the site of another clan referred to as Pasheeknga, that was likely assimilated quickly after the mission's founding in 1797.

See also
Awigna
Yaanga
:Category: Tongva populated places
Tongva language
California mission clash of cultures
Ranchos in California

References

Tongva
History of the San Fernando Valley
Former settlements in Los Angeles County, California
Former Native American populated places in California
Former populated places in California
Tongva populated places